Events from the year 1706 in the Kingdom of Scotland.

Incumbents 
 Monarch – Anne

 Secretary of State – Hugh Campbell, 3rd Earl of Loudoun, jointly with John Erskine, 6th Earl of Mar

Law officers 
 Lord Advocate – Sir James Stewart
 Solicitor General for Scotland – William Carmichael

Judiciary 
 Lord President of the Court of Session – Lord North Berwick
 Lord Justice General – Lord Tarbat
 Lord Justice Clerk – Lord Ormiston

Events 
 April – commissioners assemble in London to agree a Treaty of Union between Scotland and England.
 22 July – Treaty of Union agreed in London.
 c. September – Daniel Defoe is sent to Edinburgh as an English government agent to promote ratification of the Treaty of Union.
 3 October – opening of the Parliament of Scotland which will debate the Union.
 19 October – an Edinburgh mob opposed to the Union threatens the Lord Provost.
 4 November – the Parliament of Scotland votes in favour of the Union with England Act by 116 votes to 83.
 6 November – a Glasgow mob opposed to the Union threatens the Lord Provost.
 20 November – a copy of the Treaty of Union is burnt publicly in Dumfries.
 Lord Archibald Campbell is created 1st Earl of Ilay.

Births 
 1 April – Alexander Boswell, Lord Auchinleck judge (died 1782)
Date unknown
 James Abercrombie British Army general (died 1781)
 Walter Goodall, writer (died 1766)
 John Maule, Member of the Parliament of Great Britain (died 1781)
 William Stewart, Member of the Parliament of Great Britain (died 1748)

Deaths 
 25 August – Lord John Hay, soldier (born )
Date unknown
 Sir John Hay of Alderston, 1st Baronet

The arts
 A Choice Collection of Comic and Serious Scots Poems both ancient and modern, by several hands edited by James Watson begins publication in Edinburgh.

See also 
 Timeline of Scottish history

References 

 
Years of the 18th century in Scotland
1700s in Scotland